Poland competed at the 1948 Winter Olympics in St. Moritz, Switzerland.

Alpine skiing

Men

Men's combined

The downhill part of this event was held along with the main medal event of downhill skiing. For athletes competing in both events, the same time was used (see table above for the results). The slalom part of the event was held separate from the main medal event of slalom skiing (included in table below).

Cross-country skiing

Men

Men's 4 x 10 km relay

Ice hockey

The tournament was run in a round-robin format with nine teams participating.

* United States team was disqualified.  Only eight teams are officially ranked.

Poland 7-5 Austria
USA 23-4 Poland
Czechoslovakia 13-2 Poland
Canada 15-0 Poland
Poland 13-7 Italy
United Kingdom 7-2 Poland
Switzerland 14-0 Poland
Sweden 13-2 Poland

Nordic combined 

Events:
 18 km cross-country skiing
 normal hill ski jumping

The cross-country skiing part of this event was combined with the main medal event, meaning that athletes competing here were skiing for disciplines two at the same time. Details can be found above in this article, in the cross-country skiing section.

The ski jumping (normal hill) event was held separate from the main medal event of ski jumping, results can be found in the table below. Athletes would perform three jumps, of which the two best jumps (distance and form) were counted.

Ski jumping

References

 Olympic Winter Games 1948, full results by sports-reference.com

Nations at the 1948 Winter Olympics
1948
Olympics